The Umit Oil Field is an oil field located in Aktobe Province. It was discovered in 2008 and developed by China National Petroleum Corporation. The oil field is operated and owned by China National Petroleum Corporation.

References 

Oil fields of Kazakhstan